The Sault Thunderbirds were a professional ice hockey team in the Eastern Professional Hockey League from 1959 to 1962. The Thunderbirds were based in Sault Ste. Marie, Ontario, and played at the Sault Memorial Gardens.

Players

Hockey Hall of Fame Members
There are two members of the Hockey Hall of Fame that played for the Sault Thunderbirds. Gerry Cheevers and Phil Esposito played for the Thunderbirds in the Eastern Professional Hockey League (EPHL) between 1959 and 1962.

NHL Alumni

Sport in Sault Ste. Marie, Ontario
1959 establishments in Ontario
1962 disestablishments in Ontario
Ice hockey clubs established in 1959
Sports clubs disestablished in 1962